Macau participated in the 15th Asian Games, officially known as the XV Asiad held in Doha from 1 to 15 December 2006. Macau ranked 30th with a lone silver medal and 6 bronze medals in this edition of the Asiad.

Medalists

References

Nations at the 2006 Asian Games
2006
Asian Games